Marek Klimczok (born 25 May 1979) is a Polish former professional footballer who played as a midfielder.

Career
Klimczok was born in Katowice. He signed on with Eintracht Nordhorn as his first German team before moving to BV Cloppenburg in 2005. He subsequently joined Fortuna Düsseldorf, 1. FC Kleve, and, in 2011, SV Schermbeck. Klimczok signed for another season with SV Schermbeck in 2020. In 2021, he was among the oldest footballers in Oberliga Westfalen and was considering retirement. By the summer, he left Schermbeck.

References

External links
 

1979 births
Living people
Polish footballers
Sportspeople from Katowice
Association football midfielders
GKS Katowice players
Eintracht Nordhorn players
BV Cloppenburg players
Fortuna Düsseldorf players
Polish expatriate footballers
Polish expatriate sportspeople in Germany
Expatriate footballers in Germany